Sophronius I, (? – after 1464) was Ecumenical Patriarch of Constantinople from 1463 to 1464. The dates of his reign are disputed by scholars in a range from 1462 to 1464.

Life
Almost nothing is known about the life and the patriarchate of Sophronius. It is known an act with his name dated August 1464 which certified a cross belonged to Emperor David of Trebizond: the document is probably a forgery, but it confirms us that Sophronius was actually the patriarch. According to Blanchet, who places the reign of Sophronius after Joasaph's, he was Metropolitan of Heraclea before being elected patriarch.

One primary source designates Sophronius with the name Syropoulos. Thus it was conjectured, but not proven, that Sophronius was indeed Sylvester Syropoulos, the Orthodox cleric who participated at the Council of Florence and who wrote a chronicle of it. Sylvester Syropoulos belonged to the faction which was in favor of the East-West Union of Churches, and he signed the documents of the council. This fact works against the possible identification of Sophronius with Sylvester Syropoulos; if however he is indeed the same person, it could justify the virtual damnatio memoriae displayed in the primary sources against him.

Disputed chronology
The chronology of the reign of Sophronius I is disputed among scholars. Recent scholarship, such as Kiminas (2009), Podskalsky (1988), Laurent (1968) and Runciman (1985), places the reign of Sophronius I after Joasaph I, dating it between June 1463 and August 1464.

Other scholars, following Bishop Gemanos of Sardeis (1933–38) and Grumel (1958), as well as the official website of the Ecumenical Patriarchate, propose that Sophronius I reigned before Joasaph I, however the dates they provide differ only by a few months from the ones mentioned above due to a different suggested length of the second term of Gennadius Scholarius. Blanchet (2001) places Sophronius' reign from 1 April 1462 to summer 1464, directly after Isidore II and immediately before Joasaph.

Furthermore, there is no consensus among scholars on the length and chronology of the second and third terms of Gennadius Scholarius, which supposedly alternated the patriarchates of Joasaph and Sophronius. For a comparison of the main scholar suggestions, see the List of Patriarchs of Constantinople.

Notes

Sources

 
 
  

15th-century patriarchs of Constantinople